Bier Hoi Brewing Company produces lager-style beer in Vietnam for export to foreign markets, notably Australia.

The company first produced beer for the Woolworths Group in 330 mL cans (4.3% ABV). It currently produces 500 mL "Tall Boy" cans (4.5% ABV) for the Coles Group.

The company describes its product as "an authentic crisp flavor and mild hop bitterness; a truly refreshing ale with a delicate taste." The packaging designer said he was asked to design a "product to evoke the feeling of  a typical Vietnamese bar you might find in Saigon."

References

Vie
Alcohol in Vietnam
Beer brands
Vie
Beer in Vietnam
Breweries
Vietnamese alcoholic drinks
Vietnamese brands
Vietnamese cuisine